George Wacokecoke (born 3 October 1995) is an English professional rugby union footballer. He plays at wing for Newcastle Falcons, having previously played for Bath.

References

External links
Bath Rugby Profile

English rugby union players
Bath Rugby players
1995 births
Living people
People educated at St Joseph's College, Ipswich
Rugby union wings